() is an Arabic name that may refer to:

Abu al-Abbas Abd Allah ibn Muhammad, better known as al-Saffah (died 754), first Abbasid caliph who ruled from 750 to 754
Abu al-Abbas Abdallah ibn Harun al-Rashid, better known as al-Ma'mun (786–833), Abbasid caliph who ruled from 813 until 833
Abu al-ʽAbbās Thaʽlab (815–904), Arabic grammarian and founder of the school of Kufa
Abu al-Abbas Ahmad ibn Muhammad, better known as al-Farghani or Alfraganus (died 870), astronomer at the Abbasid court in Baghdad
Abu al-Abbas Iranshahri, 9th-century Persian polymath
Abu al-Abbas Ahmad ibn Ja'far, better known as al-Radi (909–940), Abbasid caliph ruling from Baghdad in 934–940
Abu al-Abbas as-Sabti (1129–1204), Moroccan Muslim saint
Abu al-Abbas Aḥmad ibn Ali, better known as Ahmad al-Buni (died 1225), magician and philosopher from Buna (Algeria)
Abu al-Abbas al-Azafi (1162–1236), religious and legal scholar who ruled over Ceuta (today a Spanish enclave in Morocco)
Abu al-Abbas al-Nabati (1166–1239), Andalusian botanist and pharmacist
Abu al-Abbas al-Mursi (1219–1287), Sufi saint from al-Andalus
Abu al-Abbas al-Mursi Mosque, mosque in Alexandria (Egypt)
Abu al-Abbas Ahmad ibn Abi Ali al-Hasan ibn Abu Bakr, better known as al-Hakim I (c. 1247–1302), Abbasid caliph seated in Cairo
Abu al-Abbas Ahmad, better known as Ibn Fadlallah al-Umari (1301–1349), Arab historian born in Damascus
Abu al-Abbas Ahmad II, Hafsid ruler of Ifriqiya (Tunisia) from 1370 to 1394
Abu al-Abbas Ahmad al-Mustansir, Marinid Sultan of Morocco from 1374 to 1384
Abu al-Abbās Ahmad ibn Ali, better known as al-Maqrizi (1364–1442), Egyptian historian
Abu al-Abbas Ahmad ibn Abi Jum'ah al-Maghrawi al-Wahrani, better known as Ahmad ibn Abi Jum'ah (died 1511), Maliki scholar of Islamic law active in the Maghreb (modern day Algeria and Morocco)
Abu al-Abbas Aḥmad ibn Muhammad, better known as Ibn Hajar al-Haytami (1503–1566), Egyptian hadith scholar and Islamic theologian
Abu al-Abbas Ahmad ibn Muhammad, sultan of the Moroccan Wattasid dynasty, ruled 1526–1545 and 1547–1549
Abu al-Abbas Ahmad III, Hafsid ruler of Ifriqiya (Tunisia) from 1543 to 1569
Abu al-Abbas Ahmad al-Mansur, better known as Ahmad al-Mansur or al-Mansur al-Dhahabi (1549–1603), Saadi Sultan of Morocco from 1578 to 1603
Abu al-Abbas Ahmad ibn Ahmad, better known as Ahmad Baba al-Timbukti (1556–1627), Sanhaja Berber writer, scholar, and political provocateur active in Western Sudan
Abu al-Abbas Ahmad ibn Muhammad, better known as Ahmad al-Tijani (1735–1815), Algerian Sharif who founded the Tijaniyya Sufi order
Abu al-Abbas Ahmad ibn Mustafa, better known as Ahmad al-Alawi (1869–1934), Algerian Sufi Sheikh and founder of a Sufi order called the Alawiyya

Arabic given names